Tranmere Rovers Football Club is a professional association football club based in Birkenhead, Merseyside, England. Founded in 1884 as Belmont Football Club, they adopted their current name in 1885. Tranmere's regular kit is an all-white strip with blue, or occasionally blue and green trim, their main colours since 1962. The club moved to its current home, Prenton Park, in 1912. In 1995, the ground had a major redevelopment in response to the Taylor Report. It now seats 16,567 in four stands: the Main Stand, the Kop, the Johnny King Stand and the Cowshed.

Tranmere played in regional leagues until they were invited to become a founder member of Football League Third Division North in 1921. They finished as champions for the 1937–38 season, though were relegated out of the Second Division the following year. They dropped into the Fourth Division in 1961, before winning promotion back to the third tier at the end of the 1966–67 season. Relegation in 1975 was followed by an immediate promotion in 1975–76 under the stewardship of manager John King, and this time they survived for just three seasons in the third tier until being relegated once again in 1979. During the 1980s, they were beset by financial problems and, in 1987, went into administration. However John King returned to manage the club for a second spell and guided Rovers to promotion in 1988–89, which they followed up by winning the Associate Members' Cup in 1990 and then promotion out of the play-offs in 1991.

The 1990s would prove to be the most successful period in the club's history as Tranmere remained in the second tier, and came close to reaching the Premier League with three consecutive play-off campaigns at the start of the decade. Under King's successor, John Aldridge, Tranmere experienced a number of cup runs, most notably reaching the 2000 League Cup final. They were finally relegated in 2001 and then spent 13 seasons in the third tier, before two successive relegations saw them drop out of the Football League after an 84-year stay. Tranmere spent three seasons in the National League and then returned to the third tier of the Football League via successive play-off campaigns in 2018 and 2019. They were relegated from League One in 2020 after clubs voted to end the season early due to the COVID-19 pandemic.

History

Formative years

Tranmere Rovers were, initially, formed as Belmont Football Club when the football arms of two cricket clubs – Lyndhurst Wanderers and Belmont – came together in 1884. On 15 November 1884, they won their first game 4–0 against Brunswick Rovers. This was a friendly match, as there were no leagues until 1888. Under the presidency of James McGaul, the team had a successful inaugural season, losing only one of their fifteen matches. An unrelated, disbanded side had played under the name "Tranmere Rovers Cricket Club (Association football section)" in 1881–82. On 16 September 1885, before their second season began, Belmont F.C. adopted this name Tranmere Rovers.  Tranmere is historically a large village that was subsumed within the later expansion of the town of Birkenhead.

Tranmere played their first matches at Steeles Field in Birkenhead. In 1887, they bought Ravenshaws Field from Tranmere Rugby Club. In 1895, their ground was renamed Prenton Park, although it was 25 years later that the team moved into the current stadium of the same name. Tranmere first wore a kit of blue shirts, white shorts and blue socks. In 1889 they adopted orange and maroon shirts, but in 1904 returned to wearing their original kit.

In 1886, Tranmere entered their first competition: the Liverpool and District Challenge Cup; in 1889, they entered the West Lancashire League. They joined the Combination, a much stronger league, in 1897, and won the championship in 1908. In 1910, continuing their movement through the leagues, they entered the Lancashire Combination and in 1912 they showed their ambition by moving to the present Prenton Park site, with an 800-seat stand. Tranmere won the Lancashire Combination Championship in 1914 and Stan Rowlands became the first Tranmere player to receive an international cap when he was selected to play for Wales.

Rovers continued to play throughout the First World War, although their players were criticised for avoiding military service, despite being employed in the local shipyards.

Inter-war years

Following the expulsion of Leeds City Reserves in 1919, Tranmere were able to enter the Central League. Their timing was excellent as the following season, four Central League clubs – including Tranmere – were invited to join the new Division Three North. On 27 August 1921, as founder members of the division, they won their first Football League match 4–1 against Crewe Alexandra at Prenton Park. At this time the team were managed by Bert Cooke, who did so for 23 years in total, the club record for longest serving manager.

In 1924, local youngster Dixie Dean made his debut aged 16 years 355 days. He played 30 games for Rovers, scoring 27 goals, before being transferred to Everton for £3,000. In the 1927–28 season, Dean scored a record 60 League goals for Everton. After Dean's departure, a string of talented youngsters also left for Division One clubs, leading to Cooke's reputation as a shrewd businessman. Among those sold was Pongo Waring who – having scored six goals in the 11–1 victory over Durham City – went to Aston Villa for £4,700. Waring retains the record of scoring most goals for Villa in a single season.

In 1934, an FA Cup tie between Rovers and Liverpool was watched at Anfield by 61,036 fans, then a record crowd for a game involving Rovers. One year later, Bunny Bell netted 57 goals during the 1933–34 season, and nine goals in the 13–4 Boxing Day 1935 victory over Oldham Athletic. As of 2011, the aggregate of 17 goals in one game remains a league record.

During this same period, Tranmere made several appearances in the Welsh Cup, reaching the Final on two occasions.  In 1934, they lost 3–0 to Bristol City in a replay, after a 1–1 draw.  The following season, they went one better by beating local rivals Chester 1–0 to win their first silverware since joining the Football League.

Rovers won their first championship in the Football League in 1938 with victory in Division Three North and, hence, promotion to Division Two for the first time. It is still Rovers' only championship in the Football League. However, they were relegated the next season winning six matches – the record for the worst performance of any team in Division Two.

Creation of the Superwhites

Prenton Park emerged from the Second World War largely unscathed. Tranmere rejoined the peacetime Football League in Division Three North and stayed there until the 1958 restructuring of the football league's lower divisions. Manager Peter Farrell led Tranmere to finish 11th in the final season of the Northern Section, securing a place in the new national Division Three where they were, again, founder members. The final match against Wrexham, also fighting for a place in the higher league, attracted a crowd of 19,615, which remains the highest ever attendance at a Prenton Park league match.

In 1961, Tranmere's inspirational captain Harold Bell left the club. Bell had been picked in the first game after the Second World War in the 1946 season and did not miss a match until he was dropped on 30 August 1955, a total of 459 consecutive appearances for a British team, a record which held until 2011. Rovers certainly missed their captain, and were relegated to Division Four for the first time in 1961.

The club brought in Dave Russell as manager who made some revolutionary changes. Tranmere had worn a kit of blue shirts, white shorts and blue socks since 1904 – the same colours as local rivals, Division One club Everton. Russell introduced an all-white strip to set the teams apart; these have been Tranmere's usual colours since. Russell also developed a successful youth policy which included England international Roy McFarland among its graduates. Russell guided Rovers back to Division Three in 1967, a year before a new 4,000-seater main stand was opened, and Rovers reached the fifth round of the FA Cup for the first time. Three years later the club's record attendance at Prenton Park was established as 24,424 supporters witnessed Rovers draw 2–2 with Stoke City in the FA Cup.

In 1972, Ron Yeats was installed as player/manager. He strengthened Tranmere's connections with local rivals Liverpool by recruiting several former teammates such as Ian St John, and bringing in Bill Shankly in a consultancy role. This team saw one of the most memorable Rovers results of all time when, in a League Cup tie in 1973, Tranmere beat First Division Arsenal 1–0 at their former Highbury home. However, Tranmere returned to the Fourth Division in 1975. The following decade was among the bleakest times in the club's history, with the team usually in the lower reaches of the Fourth Division, beset by financial problems, and attaining crowds of less than 2,000.

In 1979, Steve Mungall joined Tranmere from Motherwell. He went on to make more than 500 league appearances for Rovers in a 17-year period. This spell saw Rovers rise up the league and make several appearances at Wembley. He remained with the club on the coaching staff before leaving in October 2000 to pursue business interests.

1980s

Another relegation to Division Four in 1979 put the club in financial difficulties. Debts mounted throughout the 1980s, with insolvency forestalled through a series of friendly fixtures, contributions from fans and a £200,000 loan from Wirral Council. This partnership proved an enduring one, as Wirral's logo still appeared on the shirts until 2011. In July 1984 the club was sold to a Californian attorney, making Tranmere one of the first English clubs bought by a foreign owner. Nonetheless, in 1987 the club went into administration, with local businessman Peter Johnson taking over control and ownership. This proved to be a turning point in Tranmere's history, the club under his ownership enjoying by far the most successful period in its history, in which manager John King took the team from the bottom of Division Four to the brink of English football's top league. King's first task was to avoid the team finishing bottom of Division Four, which would have resulted in their relegation from the football league. Safety was guaranteed on the last game of the season with a 1–0 home win over Exeter City.

The first full season (1987–88) of King's second managerial spell in charge saw Tranmere make their first appearance at Wembley stadium when a good mid-season run of form saw them qualify for the Football League Centenary Tournament. Tranmere were the surprise stars of the event, beating Division One Wimbledon and Newcastle United before losing on penalties to eventual winners Nottingham Forest. The following season, King guided Tranmere to promotion as Division Four runners-up. Their final game played to clinch promotion was against Crewe Alexandra, and was notable for the fact that both teams needed a point to gain promotion. The first half was contested as usual, but the second half, with the score at 1–1, both teams failed to attack each other's goals, leading to combined celebrations at the final whistle.

In the same season, they achieved a string of cup successes including beating Division One Middlesbrough. Promotion was almost achieved in their first season in Division Three, losing 2–0 in the Play-off Final to Notts County., a week after Tranmere's 2–1 victory over Bristol Rovers at Wembley in the final of the Leyland DAF Trophy had clinched the club's first trophy. A key element in Tranmere's success during this period was the form of striker Ian Muir. He joined the club in 1985 and scored 180 goals in eleven seasons. He is the club's record scorer, and the first inductee to their hall of fame. Fellow hall of fame member John Morrissey joined the club in 1986. The winger spent 14 seasons at the club, making 585 appearances.

Wembley years

In the 1990–91 season, Tranmere won promotion to Division Two for the first time since the 1930s, with a 1–0 play-off win over local rivals Bolton Wanderers. Once again, Rovers made an appearance in the Leyland DAF Trophy final, this time losing 3–2 to Birmingham City. This made the play-off victory over Bolton Tranmere's fourth appearance in a Wembley final in just over a year.

Former Liverpool player John Aldridge joined the club in summer of 1991, signing from Spain's Real Sociedad for £250,000; he would remain on the club's payroll for the next 10 years, scoring 170 times to put him behind only Ian Muir in the all-time scoring charts. Aldridge also received 30 caps for the Republic of Ireland, and was the first Tranmere player to score at a World Cup. In 1993, Scotland international Pat Nevin joined the team, forming a four-man attack alongside Aldridge, Malkin and Morrissey. Tranmere reached the play-offs in three successive seasons missing out on promotion to the newly formed Premier League through defeat to Swindon Town in 1993, Leicester City in 1994, and Reading in 1995. 1994 also saw Tranmere progress to the League Cup semi-final, where they faced Aston Villa over two legs. The home leg was won 3–1 by Tranmere, with Villa scoring their only goal in the 94th minute. The away leg was 2–1 to Villa until the 88th minute with Villa finally winning 3–1, so the match went to extra time and penalties. Tranmere were one kick away from the final but Liam O'Brien's sudden death penalty was saved by Mark Bosnich and they eventually lost 5–4.
A reconstructed Prenton Park was opened in March 1995, with the all seater stadium now holding just under 17,000 supporters. One year later, John Aldridge was appointed player/manager and held that position for five years; he retired from playing in 1999.

2000 and beyond

In the 1999–2000 season, despite severe financial constraints, victories over a succession of Premiership sides led not only to a place in the sixth round of the FA Cup but a place in the 2000 Football League Cup Final against Leicester City – the first time Rovers had ever reached a major final. Matt Elliott scored Leicester's opening goal, before Tranmere's Clint Hill was sent off for a second bookable offence. Despite being reduced to ten men, David Kelly equalised; but Elliot soon netted Leicester's second goal and Tranmere lost the match 2–1. It was the last League Cup game to be played at the original Wembley stadium.

In 2000, the all-white kit was reintroduced and is still used in 2014. That season they enjoyed yet another run in Cup competitions beating local Premier League rivals Everton 3–0 at Goodison Park, then Southampton 4–3 (after being 0–3 down), before finally bowing out to Liverpool. They nevertheless struggled in League matches; Aldridge quit before Tranmere's relegation to Division Two ended a spell of ten years in Division One.

Brian Little was appointed as manager in 2003. He took Rovers to a play-off semi final in 2004–05 and a best ever 6th round replay in the 2004 FA Cup where they lost to eventual finalists, Millwall. At the end of the 2005–06 season, Little left the club and was replaced by former player Ronnie Moore. In Moore's three seasons in charge, the club finished 9th, 11th and 7th, just missing out the play-offs in the final season. Despite this, he was sacked in 2009 and replaced by former England winger John Barnes, whose only previous domestic managerial experience was with Celtic 10 years earlier. It was whilst Barnes was manager that long serving Kitman, Mark Trevor, ended his 12-year 'Labour of Love' washing the kit of his local team. Having been at the club since 1997, he washed his last kit in August 2009 ready for the home game with Charlton Athletic. Barnes' reign lasted considerably less, it was a mere five months before long-serving club physiotherapist Les Parry was given temporary charge. Rovers finished the season in 19th place in League One, avoiding relegation on the final day of the season thanks to a 3–0 victory at Stockport County. In June 2010, Parry was given the manager's job on a permanent basis.  He was sacked on 4 March 2012, after a 1–0 defeat by Chesterfield left them only one point above the relegation zone, and replaced by Ronnie Moore for the remainder of the season. Moore won six of his thirteen games in charge at the end of the season, guiding Tranmere to a comfortable mid-table position, as they finished the season in the top half for the first time in several years. Moore then signed a new one-year deal with Tranmere, keeping him at the club until the end of the 2012–13 season.

Towards the end of the 2013–14 season, Moore admitted breaking the Football Association's betting rules, and was sacked by Tranmere when the club were just outside the relegation zone. Assistant John McMahon took over as caretaker manager, but Tranmere were relegated to League Two on the final game of the season. Rob Edwards was subsequently appointed as new manager.

On 11 August 2014, it was announced that former player and Football Association chief executive Mark Palios and his wife Nicola were taking a controlling interest in the club from outgoing chairman Peter Johnson.  Mark Palios would become Executive Chairman of the club, with Johnson becoming Honorary President.

After a poor start to the season, the home loss to Plymouth Argyle on 11 October 2014 saw Tranmere in last place in the Football League for the first time since 27 August 1987 after they had lost their first two matches of that season. Edwards was sacked as manager on 13 October. Mickey Adams took over a week later, with the aim of saving the club from relegation to the Conference. However, on 25 April 2015 Tranmere were relegated from the Football League after another defeat to Plymouth Argyle in the reverse fixture, ending their 94-year stay in the leagues.

Non-league years

Gary Brabin was appointed as manager on 5 May 2015. It was a season of ups and downs, with home form suffering while away form was much more successful. It took a while for Rovers to adjust to life in the non-league, with erratic form during the season. Tranmere finished sixth, one place outside the play-off zone, in Gary Brabin's first season.

Tranmere started the 2016–17 season brightly, ranking at the top of the table at the end of August, gaining Gary Brabin the manager of the month. Form later dipped which resulted in one goal scored in the next four games, with the 1–0 defeat to Sutton United on BT Sport resulting in Brabin being sacked on 18 September 2016. Assistant manager, ex-Southport boss Paul Carden took the reins on an interim basis. On 6 October 2016, former Tranmere player Micky Mellon was appointed permanent manager. His first game in charge was against cross-border rivals Wrexham, and a 2–0 victory for Tranmere. Despite a 2nd-place finish and a club record 95 point haul, this still was not enough to gain automatic promotion back to the league. Tranmere faced Aldershot Town in the play-offs. A goal from James Norwood and a brace from Cole Stockton in the first leg away at the Recreation Ground saw Rovers take a 3–0 lead back to Prenton Park for the second leg, which ended in a 2–2 draw, Norwood and Stockton once again on the scoresheet. This gave Tranmere a 5–2 aggregate win and their first Wembley appearance in 17 years. On 14 May 2017, Tranmere suffered a 3–1 defeat in the National League play-off Final at the hands of Forest Green, Connor Jennings with Rovers first goal at Wembley since the 2000 League Cup Final.

Tranmere's 2017–18 season got off to a poor start, with 3 wins from the first 12 games. Tranmere slipped to 18th in the league, their lowest ever league position. A spectacular winter turnaround saw Tranmere move into the play-offs, where they would find themselves for the remainder of the season. This turnaround included a record breaking run of 9 consecutive home league wins. This record breaking stint was ended in February by a 4–1 defeat at the hands of eventual title winners Macclesfield Town. Tranmere responded to this defeat by winning 8 out of their next 9 games, finishing the season as National League runners-up for the second time in as many years, qualifying for the play-offs. In the play-off semi-final, Tranmere met Ebbsfleet United at home. Tranmere came from behind twice to take the game to extra time, the full-time score being 2–2, James Norwood with the first goal and Burnley loannee Josh Ginnelly with the second. An extra time free kick from James Norwood, followed by a goal from Larnell Cole saw Tranmere run out 4–2 victors after extra time, sending Tranmere to Wembley for the National League play-off Final. On 12 May 2018, a crowd of 16,306 were at Wembley for the Final against Boreham Wood. Tranmere were 2–1 victors, their first trophy in 27 years, and were promoted back to the Football League.

Return to the Football League
Under the chairmanship of Mark Palios and the management of Micky Mellon,  Tranmere played in League Two for the 2018–19 season and finished 6th, thereby reaching the play-offs. On 25 May 2019, Tranmere secured back-to-back promotions, beating Newport County 1–0 at Wembley, with a goal from Connor Jennings in the 119th minute, thus securing their spot in League One for the 2019–20 season.

By March 2020, the team were within the relegation zone, but with a game in hand on their nearest rivals and on a run of three successive victories.  The cancellation of fixtures due to the COVID-19 pandemic meant that the season could not be completed, and a vote was taken by League One clubs on 9 June to resolve promotion and relegation issues on a points per game (PPG) basis. This meant that Tranmere would be demoted to League Two for the 2020–21 season.  Club chairman Mark Palios said that the decision was unfair and that he was considering legal action as a result. He also announced that 20 members of staff would have to be made redundant.

With the team back in League Two, Mike Jackson was named as manager of Tranmere on 18 July 2020. He was sacked on 31 October 2020. Keith Hill succeeded temporary manager Ian Dawes on 21 November 2020. He was sacked on 11 May 2021, after the side reached the play-offs but before the play-off matches had started.  Tranmere were defeated by Morecambe in the play-off semi-final. At the end of May 2021, it was announced that Micky Mellon was returning to the club, after spending the season apart managing Dundee United.

Colours and crest

Belmont F.C., the forerunners of today's Rovers, wore blue shirts and white shorts, as did the early Rovers, until a radical change in 1889, when a combination of maroon and orange shirts and navy blue shorts was introduced to "dazzle" their opponents in the West Lancashire League. These were abandoned in 1904 in favour of the earlier blue and white colours which have, in some form or other, remained until the present day. In 1962, Dave Russell introduced a white strip with blue trim, saying "Tranmere Rovers should have a specific identity of its own, so on Merseyside there's now Liverpool's Red, Everton's blue and Tranmere's white". Since then, the team have worn varying combinations of blue and white, moving back towards a more predominantly white kit in 2000. The team's colours are reflected in their nickname of the "Superwhites".

Tranmere first introduced a badge on their shirt in 1962, wearing the coat of arms of the borough of Birkenhead, along with adopting their motto "Ubi fides ibi lux et robur", meaning "Where there is faith there is light and strength". The crest was replaced in 1972 by a monogram, and in 1981 by a simplified blue and white shield. In 1987, a complex  heraldic crest was introduced, adapting the Birkenhead crest through the inclusion of a football and a TRFC logo. The simpler badge was adopted in 1997, and modified slightly in 2009 to mark the club's 125-year anniversary.  The blue and white crest incorporated simplified elements of the Birkenhead civic coat of arms: the crosier and lion originally formed part of the Birkenhead Priory seal; the oak tree was a symbol of the Tranmere Local Board; the star or starfish represents Bebington; the two lions represent Oxton; and the crescents may represent the Laird family.

For the 2021–22 season, Tranmere reverted to their pre-1997 badge.

Stadium

Rovers played their first matches at Steeles Field in Birkenhead but, in 1887, they bought a new site from Tranmere Rugby Club. The ground was variously referred to as the "Borough Road Enclosure", "Ravenshaw's Field" and "South Road". The name "Prenton Park" was adopted in 1895 as a result of a suggestion in the letters page of the Football Echo. Because the land was required for housing and a school, Tranmere were forced to move and the name went with them. The present Prenton Park was opened on 9 March 1912. There were stands (also known as bleachers) on both sides of the pitch, a paddock and three open terraces, the general format which remained until 1994.

Many improvements to the ground were driven by changes in legislation. The biggest change of all took place during 1994 and 1995. The Taylor Report suggested that all stadia in the top two divisions of English football should no longer permit standing. The club's response was to redevelop three sides of the ground with entirely new all-seater stands created – the Borough Road Stand (now the Johnny King Stand), the Cowshed and the new Kop, in addition to the existing Main Stand. Capacity in the ground thus increased from 14,200 to the 16,567 of today. On 11 March 1995, the new ground was officially opened at a cost of £3.1 million.

Attendances at the ground have fluctuated over its hundred-year history. Around 8,000 visitors watched the first game at the stadium, as Tranmere beat Lancaster Town 8–0. Prenton Park's largest-ever crowd was 24,424 for a 1972 FA Cup match between Tranmere and Stoke City. In 2010, an average of 5,000 fans attended each home game.

Supporters and rivalries

Tranmere Rovers had an average home attendance of 6,552 during the 2018–19 season, making them the 4th best supported club in League Two and 42nd in The Football League as a whole.  The club has a number of supporters' groups, including the Tranmere Rovers Supporters Trust; in 2010, the trust raised £12,500 for the club to sign Andy Robinson on loan. In 2011, they raised £200,000 and plan to purchase a controlling interest in Tranmere. TSB (Tranmere Stanley Boys) is the hooligan firm associated with the club. The club has been the subject of an independent supporters' fanzine Give Us an R since the 1990s.

Despite being geographically closest to Everton and Liverpool, Tranmere's time in the lower leagues has meant that they have rarely met either club and have built up traditional rivalries with near neighbours Chester, Wrexham and Southport, all of whom are now non-league clubs.  According to a survey entitled 'The League of Love and Hate' conducted in August 2019, Tranmere fans listed the more distant Bolton Wanderers and Oldham Athletic as their biggest rivals, followed by Everton, Liverpool and Crewe Alexandra, although the results are debatable as the census does not contain non-league clubs. Tranmere also had a fierce rivalry with Wallasey-based near neighbours New Brighton until the latter club failed  to be re-elected to the Football League in 1951.

As of the end of the 2021–22 season, Tranmere had met the following teams most times in the Football League:

Tranmere Rovers Ladies

Tranmere Rovers Ladies Football Club were founded in 1990. Based in the Wirral, they are affiliated with the men's team, and play home games at Villa Park, the home of Ashville F.C., in Wallasey. Between 1996 and 2004 they competed in the FA Premier League National Division, then the top tier of the English women's football pyramid. Since 2011, they have played in the North West Regional League, Premier Division. As of the start of the 2011–12 season, they have won the Cheshire Cup a record 11 times.

Players

First-team squad

Out on loan

Former players
As part of the club's 125-year anniversary celebrations in 2010, a hall of fame was announced, initially honouring seven former players and managers: Ian Muir, John Aldridge, John King, Ray Mathias, Steve Mungall, John Morrissey and Pat Nevin. Harold Bell holds the record for the most consecutive league appearances for a British team. He was picked for the first game after the Second World War in the 1946–47 season and did not miss a match until 30 August 1955, a total of 401 consecutive matches in the Third Division North.

Officials

Coaching staff

Managers

By the start of the 2020–21 season, the club had employed 30 managers. The first man to hold this position was Bert Cooke, appointed in 1912. He oversaw the club's entry into the Football League and remained in charge for 23 years, the longest spell of any manager at the club. Major changes were not seen until businessman Dave Russell took over in 1961. His introductions included the team's current all-white kit and regularly arranged floodlit home fixtures on Friday evenings rather than the usual Saturday afternoon. Rock band and Tranmere fans Half Man Half Biscuit described the practice in their song "Friday Night And The Gates Are Low".

Tranmere's most successful period came at the end of the twentieth century. John King returned for his third spell at the club in 1987, having previously both played and managed the team. He led them to a victory in the League Trophy, and from the bottom of the Fourth Division to reach the play-offs for promotion to the Premier League on three occasions. Success continued under King's replacement, John Aldridge, including an appearance in the 2000 Football League Cup Final. From 2009, they were managed by former club physiotherapist, Les Parry, until he was sacked on 4 March 2012, and replaced by Ronnie Moore.  In February 2014 it was reported that Moore was under investigation by The Football Association, for breaching its rules against betting on competitions in which his club were involved.  Three days later, he was suspended, and after admitting the FA's charges he was sacked on 9 April 2014.

On 27 May 2014, the club announced that Rob Edwards had been appointed as their new manager. He was sacked on 13 October 2014. Moving quickly to arrest the decline which had seen Tranmere slump to the bottom of League Two, former Port Vale manager Micky Adams' appointment was announced on 16 October 2014. He left the club by mutual consent on 19 April 2015, when the club were bottom of the league with two matches remaining. He was replaced by Gary Brabin, whose contract was in turn ended in September 2016. Micky Mellon was appointed manager the following month, going on to lead the team to two consecutive play-off Final victories in the 2017–18 and 2018–19 seasons and a return to League One. After four years at Tranmere, Mellon moved to Dundee United on 6 July 2020.

On 18 July 2020, Mellon's former assistant manager Mike Jackson was appointed as manager, however his tenure was short-lived. After only two league wins in his first 10 games Jackson was sacked on 31 October 2020 following a 1–0 home defeat to Morecambe. He was replaced as first team manager on 21 November by Keith Hill. Hill opened his reign with a 1–0 victory against play-off hopefuls Carlisle United. His side were top of the form table (after 20 games) in February, the team's spine spearheaded by Scott Davies, Peter Clarke, Manny Monthé, Jay Spearing, Paul Lewis and finally, James Vaughan, who is still the youngest ever Premier League goalscorer since 2005. Hill was sacked in May 2021, after the team had reached the League Two play-offs but before the play-off matches took place. At the end of May 2021, Micky Mellon returned to Tranmere for a second spell as manager.

Full time managers are shown below (excluding caretaker managers).

Honours
Source:

League
 Football League Third Division / Second Division / League One (tier 3)
 Play-off winners: 1990–91
 Play-off runners-up: 1989–90
 Football League Third Division North (tier 3)
 Champions: 1937–38
 Football League Fourth Division / League Two (tier 4)
 2nd place promotion: 1988–89
 4th place promotion: 1966–67, 1975–76
 Play-off winners: 2018–19
 National League (tier 5)
 Play-off winners: 2017–18
 Lancashire Combination
 Champions: 1913–14
 Division two promotion: 1911–12
 The Combination
 Champions: 1907–08

Cup

 League Cup
 Runners-up: 1999–2000
 League Trophy
 Winners: 1989–90
 Runners-up: 1990–91, 2020–21
 Welsh Cup
 Winners: 1934–35
 Runners-up: 1933–34

Records
 Highest league finish: 4th in Football League First Division, 1992–93
 Best FA Cup performance: Quarter-finals 1999–2000, 2000–01, 2003–04
 Best League Cup performance: Runners-up 1999–2000
 Best League Trophy performance: Winners 1989–90
 Best FA Trophy performance: Semi-finals 2016–17
 Scoreline:
 13–4, against Oldham Athletic, 26 December 1935 The aggregate of 17 goals in one game remains a league record.
 9–0 against Solihull Moors, 8 April 2017
 1–9 against Tottenham Hotspur, FA Cup 3rd round replay, 14 January 1953
 Highest attendance: 74,313, against Leicester City, 27 February 2000, League Cup Final at Wembley Stadium
 Highest home attendance: 24,424, against Stoke City, 5 February 1972, FA Cup
 Most goals (total): Ian Muir, 180
 Most goals in a season: Bunny Bell (1934–35) and John Aldridge (1991–92), 40
 Most appearances: Ray Mathias, 637

References
General
  .
 
 
 
 

Specific

External links

 Official website
 
 

 
1884 establishments in England
Association football clubs established in 1884
Sport in Birkenhead
Football clubs in Merseyside
Football clubs in England
Lancashire Combination
English Football League clubs
National League (English football) clubs
EFL Trophy winners
Companies that have entered administration in the United Kingdom